The Bukovina Society Headquarters and Museum is a museum of artifacts from Bukovina German immigrants. The museum is operated by the Bukovina Society of the Americas and is located at the former First Congregational Church building in Ellis, Kansas, United States. The museum was established in 1992 by the Bukovina-German immigrant community, which settled in Ellis in 1886.

References

External links 
 

1988 establishments in Kansas
Bukovina German diaspora
Museums in Ellis County, Kansas
Ethnic museums in Kansas
German-American culture in Kansas
German-American museums
Moldovan American
Museums established in 1988
Romanian-American culture
Ukrainian-American culture